St. George may refer to:

St. George (Manitoba provincial electoral district)
St. George (Ontario provincial electoral district)